Daniel Cammish (born 10 April 1989 in Leeds) is a racing driver from Great Britain currently competing in a Ford Focus for NAPA Racing UK in the British Touring Car Championship.

Early life
Cammish was born in Leeds, West Yorkshire. He attended Morley High School.

Racing career
Cammish made his karting debut in 2003, driving in the Manchester & Buxton Kart Club Junior Rotax Championship, in which he finished 20th.
He raced in the Kartmasters British Grand Prix Super Libre, Super 1 National Formula A Championship and Super 1 National Rotax Max Championship before graduating to car racing in 2009, where he won the Formula Ford Scholarship class and competed in the ADAC Formel Masters. In 2012, he suffered a broken pelvis in a high-speed accident during a race in Spain.

Cammish won the 2013 British Formula Ford Championship, winning every race that he entered (24 wins in 24 races) as well as starting all but two of the races from the pole and setting 19 fastest laps. He set multiple records in the process of winning. His dominance of the Formula Ford Championship ensured that he would win the title in Rockingham by September, with two more race weekends to spare. Cammish thus skipped the final rounds of the season to celebrate winning the title. The championship runner-up and Cammish's nearest rival, Harrison Scott, won the third race at Silverstone, with the other remaining races going to international drivers Camren Kaminsky, Jayde Kruger and Juan Angel Rosso.

This won both Cammish and Scott a test for the BTCC Airwaves Ford team, with Cammish eyeing a full-time drive for the 2014 season. However Cammish secured a drive with Team Parker Racing alongside Barrie Baxter in a Porsche 911 competing in the 2014 British GT Championship.

In 2015, he raced in Porsche Supercup and Porsche Carrera Cup GB, winning the title in the latter. It was another dominant performance in which he finished inside the top two for every race that season, securing the title after winning 11 of the 16 rounds. He returned to the series in 2016. He won 12 races and became double champion. Cammish Returned once again in 2017 but this time only finished 3rd due to a fire costing him points in the penultimate round of the season.

For 2018 he stepped up to the British Touring Car Championship with Honda and Team Dynamics. His debut year produced mixed results and he took his first win in the championship at the final round on the Brands Hatch GP circuit. He finished the year 10th with 7 podiums. Cammish continued with the team in 2019 accumulating 2 Wins and 14 Podiums on his way to joint 2nd in the championship. He had been leading the championship going into the final race but brake failure on the penultimate lap of the final race meant he lost out by just 2 points.

In 2021, he returned to Porsche Carrera Cup GB sporting the iconic blue and yellow colours of Duckhams Oils.

Racing record

Career summary

† As Cammish was a guest driver, he was ineligible for championship points.

Complete British GT Championship results
(key) (Races in bold indicate pole position) (Races in italics indicate fastest lap)

Complete Porsche Carrera Cup Great Britain results
(key) (Races in bold indicate pole position) (Races in italics indicate fastest lap)

‡ As Cammish was a guest driver, he was ineligible to score points.

Complete Porsche Supercup results
(key) (Races in bold indicate pole position) (Races in italics indicate fastest lap)

‡ As Cammish was a guest driver, he was ineligible to score points.
† Driver did not finish the race, but was classified as he completed over 75% of the race distance.

Complete British Touring Car Championship results
(key) (Races in bold indicate pole position – 1 point awarded just in first race; races in italics indicate fastest lap – 1 point awarded all races; * signifies that driver led race for at least one lap – 1 point given all races)

References

External links
 

1989 births
Living people
Sportspeople from Leeds
English racing drivers
British Touring Car Championship drivers
Porsche Carrera Cup GB drivers
Porsche Supercup drivers
British GT Championship drivers
Sportspeople from Morley, West Yorkshire
Formula Renault Eurocup drivers
Neuhauser Racing drivers
Mark Burdett Motorsport drivers
Eurasia Motorsport drivers
Walter Lechner Racing drivers
24H Series drivers
Porsche Carrera Cup Germany drivers